Cesare Frank Figliuzzi, Jr. (born September 12, 1962) is a former federal law enforcement agent. He is the former assistant director for counterintelligence at the Federal Bureau of Investigation.  Figliuzzi was previously the special agent in charge of the Federal Bureau of Investigation's Cleveland Division, which includes all of northern Ohio, and the major cities of Cleveland, Toledo, Youngstown, Akron, and Canton. Following his FBI service, Figliuzzi joined General Electric and served for five years as assistant chief security officer for investigations, insider threat, workplace violence prevention, and special event security for GE's 300,000 employees in 180 countries. Figliuzzi is currently a frequent national security contributor for NBC and MSNBC News.

Education
Figliuzzi earned a Bachelor of Arts degree in English literature from Fairfield University and a Juris Doctor with honors from the University of Connecticut School of Law. Figliuzzi also completed the Harvard University National Security Program for Senior Executives in Government at the John F. Kennedy School of Government.

Career
Figliuzzi joined the FBI as a special agent in August 1987 and has worked for the FBI in the Atlanta and Washington, D.C., headquarters, and the San Francisco, Miami, and Cleveland offices. He was the assistant special agent in charge of the Miami Field Office, the FBI's fifth largest office.  Figliuzzi also served as the FBI's chief inspector from December 2005 until his appointment as head of the Cleveland Division. As Assistant Director, he was based at FBI Headquarters in Washington, D.C., and worked closely with other government executives.
 In February 2011 then-director Robert Mueller appointed Figliuzzi assistant director of the FBI's Counterintelligence Division.

References

External links

 Author profile and articles at Security magazine

1962 births
2001 anthrax attacks
Fairfield University alumni
Federal Bureau of Investigation agents
Harvard Kennedy School alumni
Living people
MSNBC people
NBC News people
Place of birth missing (living people)
University of Connecticut School of Law alumni